My Love Is Called Margarita (Spanish: Margarita se llama mi amor) is a 1961 Spanish romantic comedy film directed by Ramón Fernández and starring Mercedes Alonso, Antonio Cifariello and Manuel Zarzo.

Cast
 Mercedes Alonso as Margarita Rodríguez Garcés  
 Antonio Cifariello as Eduardo Heredia, profesor de literatura 
 Manuel Zarzo as Ignacio García Cruz 'Nacho'  
 Isana Medel 
 Ángel del Pozo 
 Jesús Colomer as Desiderio Conesa Ortiz 'Desi'  
 María Silva as Alumna que se sienta junto a Nacho  
 Amparo Baró 
 Óscar Cortina 
 Carlos Piñar 
 Ángel Álvarez as Manolo, hombre sentado en el baile  
 José Torres 
 Goyo Lebrero as Barrendero 
 Paula Martel 
 Aníbal Vela hijo 
 Violeta Moreda 
 Antonio Alfonso Vidal 
 Aníbal Vela 
 Víctor Valverde 
 Carmen Rodríguez 
 Juan José Sáez 
 Antonio Moreno 
 Manuel San Francisco 
 Rosa Palomar 
 Rufino Inglés 
 Juan Cazalilla 
 Junior 
 Ena Sedeño 
 Charito Trallero 
 Marta Reves 
 Rafael Ibáñez 
 Rafael Hernández 
 Joaquín Bergía 
 Plácido Sequeiros 
 José Isbert as Don Severino, profesor de historia  
 Jesús Tordesillas 
 Montserrat Salvador 
 Margot Cottens as Madre de Margarita  
 Gisia Paradís as Nina  
 José Luis Ozores as Felipe Gurriato Orbaneja 'Gurriato' 
 Paco Romero

References

Bibliography 
 Bentley, Bernard. A Companion to Spanish Cinema. Boydell & Brewer, 2008.

External links 
 

1961 romantic comedy films
Spanish romantic comedy films
1961 films
1960s Spanish-language films
1960s Spanish films